Sainte-Mère-Église is a commune in the northwestern French department of Manche, in Normandy. On 1 January 2016, the former communes of Beuzeville-au-Plain, Chef-du-Pont, Écoquenéauville and Foucarville were merged into Sainte-Mère-Église. On 1 January 2019, the former communes of Carquebut and Ravenoville were merged into Sainte-Mère-Église.

Geography
Sainte-Mère-Église lies in a flat area of the Cotentin peninsula known locally as le Plain (as opposed to the standard French term la plaine). The Plain is bounded on the west by the Merderet River and by the English channel to the east, and by the communes of Valognes and Carentan to the north and south, respectively. Besides Sainte-Mère-Église, the Plain's other major town is Montebourg, and its coast includes Utah Beach.

Although most of the Cotentin Peninsula belongs to the Armorican Massif, the Plain is part of the Paris Basin. Argillaceous limestone from the Sinemurian contributes to the region's dairy product appellation (AOC) Isigny-Sainte-Mère, which it shares with Bessin. Horse breeding has long been practiced in the Plain, which is regarded as the cradle of the Anglo-Norman horse breed, the product of English stallions and mares from the Cotentin Peninsula.

History
Founded in the eleventh century, the earliest records (1080–1082) include the name Sancte Marie Ecclesia, Latin for "Church of St. Mary", while a later document written in Norman-French (1317) mentions Saincte Mariglise. The current French form of the name is ambiguous, with the additional meaning, "Holy Mother Church". The town was significantly involved in the Hundred Years' War as well as the Wars of Religion.

The town played a significant part in the World War II Normandy landings because of its postion in the middle of route N13, which the Germans would have used on any counterattack on the troops landing on Utah and Omaha Beaches. In the early morning of 6 June 1944 mixed units of the U.S. 82nd Airborne and U.S. 101st Airborne Divisions occupied the town in Mission Boston, making it one of the first towns liberated in the invasion.

D-Day battle
The early airborne landings, at about 01:40, resulted in heavy casualties. Some buildings in town caught fire that night, illuminating the sky, and making easy targets of the descending men. Some were killed by the fire. Many hanging from trees and utility poles were shot.

A well-known incident involved paratrooper John Steele of the 505th Parachute Infantry Regiment (PIR), whose parachute caught on the spire of the town church. He hung there for two hours, pretending to be dead until the Germans took him prisoner. Steele later escaped and rejoined his division when US troops of the 3rd Battalion, 505th Parachute Infantry Regiment attacked the village, capturing thirty Germans and killing eleven. The incident was portrayed in the movie The Longest Day by actor Red Buttons.

At 05:00, a force led by Lt. Colonel Edward C. Krause of the 505th PIR took the town with little resistance. Allegedly the German garrison was confused and had retired for the night. However, heavy German counterattacks began later in the day and into the next.  The lightly armed troops held the town until reinforced by tanks from nearby Utah Beach in the afternoon of 7June.

Krause and Lt. Colonel Benjamin H. Vandervoort both received the Distinguished Service Cross for their actions during the capture of the town. Sgt. George Bowler Tullidge III received the Bronze Star, and a collection of Bible verses and his letters home, A Paratrooper's Faith was distributed throughout the 82nd Airborne by his parents from his death until 1995. 2nd Lt. Thomas J. Tighe of the 70th Tank Battalion was killed when his tank was hit by German artillery fire and received the Silver Star posthumously for his actions on the morning of June 7. 

Henry Langrehr was also involved in the capture of Sainte-Mère-Église. He crashed through a greenhouse roof, as retold in The Longest Day. On 6November 2007, he received the Legion of Honour medal from the President of France, Nicolas Sarkozy along with five other men.

Heraldry

Sights
Tourism in Sainte-Mère-Église today centers on its role in the D-Day invasion. There are many small museums (such as the Airborne Museum) and World War II-related giftshops and eating places. A dummy paratrooper hangs from the church spire, commemorating the story of John Steele.

Behind the church is a spring, believed by pilgrims to have healing powers, dedicated to Saint Mewan (Saint Méen).

Gallery

Notable people
William of Sainte-Mère-Église, Bishop of London from 1198 to 1221.

See also
Communes of the Manche department

Also of note is that Sainte-Mère-Église is twinned with the English village Sturminster Marshall

References

Further reading

External links

 The Airborne Museum
 The Tourist Office of the District Communities of Sainte-Mère-Église

Saintemereeglise